Jozef Kovacik (born January 1, 1980) is a Slovak professional ice hockey. He currently plays with HC Kometa Brno in the Czech Extraliga.

He played with HC Slovan Bratislava in the Slovak Extraliga.

Career statistics

References

External links

1980 births
Living people
HC Kometa Brno players
HC Slovan Bratislava players
HK Nitra players
HKM Zvolen players
MHC Martin players
Slovak ice hockey defencemen
Sportspeople from Topoľčany
Slovak expatriate ice hockey players in the Czech Republic
Slovak expatriate ice hockey players in Germany